Wagnerville is a ghost town in Mound Township, Phillips County, Kansas, United States.

History
Wagnerville was issued a post office in 1882. The post office was discontinued in 1888.

References

Former populated places in Phillips County, Kansas
Former populated places in Kansas